Kevin Deutschmann (born 14 May 1944) is a South African former cricketer. He played in six first-class and two List A matches for Border in 1972/73 and 1973/74.

See also
 List of Border representative cricketers

References

External links
 

1944 births
Living people
South African cricketers
Border cricketers
Sportspeople from Qonce